St. Paul's Church is a historic Episcopal church located at Owego in Tioga County, New York.  It is a High Victorian Gothic style structure built of rough cut bluestone trimmed with orange brick and terra cotta.  The church is composed of a small entry vestibule, the gabled main block housing the nave and chancel, a shallow transept lying opposite a semicircular Lady Chapel, a tower, and an arcaded porch and a sacristy.  It was designed by architect William Halsey Wood (1855–1897) and was built in 1893–1894.

It was listed on the National Register of Historic Places in 1997.

References

External links
St. Paul's Episcopal Church, Owego, NY

Churches completed in 1894
19th-century Episcopal church buildings
Churches on the National Register of Historic Places in New York (state)
Episcopal church buildings in New York (state)
Gothic Revival church buildings in New York (state)
Churches in Tioga County, New York
National Register of Historic Places in Tioga County, New York